The grand rhabdornis (Rhabdornis grandis), also known as the long-billed rhabdornis or long-billed creeper, is a species of bird currently placed in the starling family, Sturnidae. It is endemic to Luzon Island in the Philippines. It is sometimes treated as a subspecies of the stripe-breasted creeper (R. inornatus).

Description 
A medium-sized, long-billed bird with a white throat and belly, a brown back, rufous wings and tail, a black mask with a thin white eyebrow above, a gray crown, and brown sides broadly streaked white.

Habitat and Conservation Status 
Its natural habitat is tropical mid-elevation and high elevation montane forest. The IUCN lists it as a Least-concern species but despite this the population is still said to be declining due to habitat loss and fragmentation.

References

grand rhabdornis
Birds of Luzon
grand rhabdornis
Taxonomy articles created by Polbot